Julian Darley is a filmmaker, writer and speaker on policy responses to global environmental degradation. He is the author of the book High Noon for Natural Gas, and the founder of Global Public Media, Post Carbon Institute and Mysterious Movies Ltd. He lives in London, England.

Educational background
Darley has an eclectic educational background, with an MSc in Environment and Sociology from the University of Surrey, UK, where he published a thesis examining the coverage of complex environmental issues in the foremost radio current affairs programmes at the BBC. He also has an MA in Journalism and Communications from the University of Texas at Austin, where he wrote his thesis on the elimination of television.

Political works 
In pursuit of better understanding of hydrocarbon, Julian wrote a book called High Noon for Natural Gas: the New Energy Crisis about a natural gas crisis in North America and other industrialized nations. He also co-authored Relocalize Now! Getting Ready for Climate Change and the End of Cheap Oil (2005, unreleased) in collaboration with Celine Rich, Dave Room and Richard Heinberg, a book tackling the subjects of “global relocalization” of economy, society and culture.

References

External links
 Mysterious Movies Ltd.
 End of Suburbia
 Running on Empty - The End of Suburbia and the future slums of Irvine (film review)

Alumni of the University of Surrey
Living people
1958 births